William Sellers (1824–1905) was an American engineer and inventor.

William Sellers may also refer to:

William Sellers (colonial officer), British officer in Nigeria
William D. Sellers  (1928–2014), American meteorologist and climatologist
William W. Sellers (born 1968), president of Wentworth Military Academy and College in Lexington, Missouri
Will Sellers (born 1963), associate justice of the Supreme Court of Alabama

See also
William Sellars (disambiguation)
William Seller (1797–1869), Scottish physician and botanist